Classics of Western Spirituality [CWS] is an English-language book series published by Paulist Press since 1978, which offers a library of historical texts on Christian spirituality as well as a representative selection of works on Jewish, Islamic, Sufi and Native American spirituality. Each volume is selected and translated by one or more scholars or spiritual leaders, with scholarly introductions and bibliographies of both primary and secondary materials. The series contains multiple genres of spiritual writing, including poems, songs, essays, theological treatises, meditations, mystical biographies, and philosophical investigations, and features works by famous authors such as Augustine of Hippo and Martin Luther. As well as lesser-known authors such as Maximus the Confessor and Moses de León.

CWS was originally planned by an editorial board of some thirty scholars to "[foster] more enlightened spiritual direction and fruitful meditation practices", and was projected to contain sixty volumes. Today it comprises more than 130 volumes, and for ease of reference has been thematically subdivided below into pre-Reformation Christianity (57 volumes), Christianity after the Reformation (47 volumes) and Judaism, Islam and Native American religions (28 volumes).

The series was almost immediately "acclaimed as one of the most important religious publishing events of recent years." An early reviewer remarked that "the impression left by a preliminary contact with this courageous attempt to open the vast treasures of Western spiritual classics to present-day readers is one of astonished admiration. It is a triumph of editing and the printer's art." More recently, in assessing the impact of the series as a whole, one scholar concluded that CWS has been responsible "not only in making the acknowledged classics of the tradition more available, accessible, and better known but also in the process (...) expanding and deepening the canon of classics and thereby both broadening and refining the definition of 'classics' and of 'spirituality' itself."

Pre-Reformation Christianity
 Albert and Thomas: Selected Writings, edited by Simon Tugwell (1988)
 Anchoritic Spirituality: Ancrene Wisse and Associated Works, translated by Anne Savage and Nicholas Watson (1991)
 Angela of Foligno: Complete Works, translated by Paul Lachance (1993)
 Angelic Spirituality: Medieval Perspectives on the Ways of Angels, translated by Steven L. Chase (2002)
 Anglo-Saxon Spirituality: Selected Writings, translated by Robert Boenig (2000)
 Apocalyptic Spirituality: Treatises and Letters of Lactantius, Adso of Montier-en-Der, Joachim of Fiore, the Spiritual Franciscans, Savonarola, translated by Bernard McGinn (1979)
 Athanasius of Alexandria: The Life of Antony and the Letter to Marcellinus, translated by Robert C. Gregg (1980)
 Augustine of Hippo: Selected Writings, translated by Mary T. Clark (1984)
 Bernard of Clairvaux: Selected Works, translated by Gillian Evans (1987)
 Birgitta of Sweden: Life and Selected Writings, edited by Marguerite Tjader Harris (1990)
 Bonaventure: The Soul’s Journey into God, The Tree of Life, The Life of St. Francis, edited by Ewert Cousins (1978)
 Carthusian Spirituality: The Writings of Hugh of Balma and Guigo de Ponte, translated by Dennis D. Martin (1997)
 Catherine of Genoa: Purgation and Purgatory, the Spiritual Dialogue, translated by Serge Hughes (1979)
 Catherine of Siena: The Dialogue, translated by Suzanne Noffke (1980)
 Celtic Spirituality, edited by Oliver Davies (1999)
 The Cloud of Unknowing, edited by James Walsh (1981)
 Devotio Moderna: Basic Writings, translated by John H. Van Engen (1988)
 Dominican Penitent Women, edited by Maiju Lehmijoki-Gardner (2005)
 The Earliest Franciscans: The Legacy of Giles of Assisi, Roger of Provence, and James of Milan, edited by Paul Lachance (2015)
 Early Dominicans: Selected Writings, edited by Simon Tugwell (1982)
 Elisabeth of Schönau: The Complete Works, translated by Anne L. Clark (2000)
 Ephrem the Syrian: Hymns, translated by Kathleen E. McVey (1989)
 Francis and Clare: The Complete Works, translated by Regis J. Armstrong and Ignatius C. Brady (1982)
 Francisco de Osuna: The Third Spiritual Alphabet, translated by Mary E. Giles (1981)
 Gertrude of Helfta: The Herald of Divine Love, edited by Margaret Winkworth (1993)
 Gregory of Nyssa: The Life of Moses, translated by Everett Ferguson and Abraham Malherbe (1978)
 Gregory Palamas: The Triads, edited by John Meyendorff (1983)
 Hadewijch: The Complete Works, translated by Columba Hart (1980)
 Henry Suso: The Exemplar, with Two German Sermons, edited by Frank Tobin (1989)
 Hildegard of Bingen: Scivias, translated by Columba Hart and Jane Bishop (1990)
 Ignatius of Loyola: The Spiritual Exercises and Selected Works, edited by George Ganss (1991)
 Jacopone da Todi: The Lauds, translated by Elizabeth Hughes and Serge Hughes (1982)
 Jean Gerson: Early Works, translated by Brian Patrick McGuire (1998)
 Johannes Tauler: Sermons, translated by Maria Shrady (1985)
 John Cassian: Conferences, translated by Colm Luibheid (1985)
 John Climacus: The Ladder of Divine Ascent, translated by Colm Luibheid and Norman Russell (1982)
 John Ruusbroec: The Spiritual Espousals and Other Works, translated by James A. Wiseman (1985)
 Julian of Norwich: Showings, translated by Edmund Colledge and James Walsh (1978)
 Late Medieval Mysticism of the Low Countries, edited by Rik Van Nieuwenhove, Robert Faesen, and Helen Rolfson (2008)
 Margaret Ebner: Major Works, edited by Leonard P. Hindsley (1993)
 Marguerite Porete: The Mirror of Simple Souls, translated by Ellen Babinsky (1993)
 Maximus the Confessor: Selected Writings, translated by George C. Berthold (1985)
 Mechthild of Hackeborn: The Book of Special Grace, translated by Barbara Newman (2017)
 Mechthild of Magdeburg: The Flowing Light of the Godhead, translated by Frank Tobin (1998)
 Meister Eckhart: The Essential Sermons, Commentaries, Treatises, and Defense, translated by Edmund Colledge (1981)
 Meister Eckhart: Teacher and Preacher, edited by Bernard McGinn (1986)
 Nicholas of Cusa: Selected Spiritual Writings, translated by H. Lawrence Bond (1997)
 Norbert and Early Norbertine Spirituality compiled by Theodore J. Antry and Carol Neel (2007)
 Origen: An Exhortation to Martyrdom, Prayer and Selected Works, translated by Rowan A. Greer (1979)
 Pseudo-Dionysius: The Complete Works, translated by Colm Luibheid (1987)
 Pseudo-Macarius: The Fifty Spiritual Homilies and the Great Letter, edited by George A. Maloney (1992)
 The Pursuit of Wisdom and Other Works, by the Author of The Cloud of Unknowing, edited by James Walsh (1988)
 Richard of St. Victor: The Twelve Patriarchs, The Mystical Ark, Book Three of the Trinity, translated by Grover A. Zinn (1979)
 Richard Rolle: The English Writings, edited by Rosamund S. Allen (1988)
 Symeon the New Theologian: The Discourses, translated by C. J. de Catanzaro (1980)
 The Venerable Bede: One the Song of Songs and Selected Writings, edited by Arthur G. Holder (2011)
 Walter Hilton: The Scale of Perfection, translated by John P. H. Clark and Rosemary Dorward (1991)

Post-Reformation Christianity
 Alphonsus de Liguori: Selected Writings, edited by Fredrick M. Jones (1999)
 Angelus Silesius: The Cherubinic Wanderer, translated by Maria Shrady (1986)
 Bérulle and the French School: Selected Writings, edited by William M. Thompson (1989)
 Cambridge Platonist Spirituality, edited by Charles Taliaferro and Alison J. Teply (2004)
 Early Anabaptist Spirituality: Selected Writings, edited by Daniel Liechty (1994)
 Early Protestant Spirituality, edited by Scott H. Hendrix (2009)
 Edith Stein: Selected Writings, edited by Marian Maskulak (2016)
 Élisabeth Leseur: Selected Writings, edited by Janet Ruffing (2005)
 Emanuel Swedenborg: The Universal Human and Soul-Body Interaction, edited by George F. Dole (1984)
 The Emergence of Evangelical Spirituality: The Age of Edwards, Newton, and Whitefield, edited by Tom Schwanda (2016)
 Fénelon: Selected Writings, edited by Chad Helms (2006)
 Francis de Sales, Jane de Chantal: Letters of Spiritual Devotion, translated by Péronne Marie Thibert (1988)
 George Herbert: The Country Parson and the Temple, edited by John N. Wall Jr. (1981)
 Jacob Boehme: The Way to Christ, edited by Peter C. Erb (1978)
 John Baptist de La Salle: Spirituality of Christian Education, edited by Carl Koch, Jeffrey Calligan, and Jeffrey Gros (2004)
 Jeanne Guyon: Selected Writings, edited by Dianne Guenin-Lelie and Ronney Mourad (2012)
 Jeremy Taylor: Selected Works, edited by Thomas K. Carroll (1990)
 Johann Arndt: True Christianity, translated by Peter C. Erb (1979)
 John and Charles Wesley: Selected Writings and Hymns, edited by Frank Whaling (1981)
 John Calvin: Writings on Pastoral Piety, edited by Elsie Anne McKee (2001)
 John Comenius: The Labyrinth of the World and the Paradise of the Heart, translated by Howard Louthan and Andrea Sterk (1998)
 John Donne: Selections from Divine Poems, Sermons, Devotions, and Prayers, edited by John Booty (1990)
 John Henry Newman: Selected Sermons, edited by Ian Ker (1994)
 John of Avila: Audi, filia–Listen, O Daughter, translated by Joan Frances Gormley (2006)
 John of the Cross: Selected Writings, edited by Kieran Kavanaugh (1987)
 Jonathan Edwards: Spiritual Writings, edited by Kyle C. Stroebel, Adriaan C. Neele, and Kenneth P. Minkema (2019)
 Luis de León: The Names of Christ, translated by Manuel Durán and William Kluback (1984)
 Luther’s Spirituality, edited by Philip D. W. Krey and Peter D. S. Krey (2007)
 Maria Maddalena de’ Pazzi: Selected Revelations, translated by Amando Maggi (2000)
 Miguel de Molinos: The Spiritual Guide, edited by Robert P. Baird (2010)
 Nicodemos of the Holy Mountain: A Handbook of Spiritual Counsel, translated by Peter A. Chamberas (1989)
 Nil Sorsky: The Complete Writings, edited by George A. Maloney (2003)
 The Pietists: Selected Writings, edited by Peter C. Erb (1983)
 The Pilgrim's Tale, edited by Aleksei Pentkovsky (1999)
 Quaker Spirituality: Selected Writings, edited by Douglas Steere (1984)
 Robert Bellarmine: Spiritual Writings, edited by John P. Donnelly and Roland J. Teske (1989)
 Scandinavian Pietists: Spiritual Writings for 19th Century Norway, Denmark, Sweden and Finland, edited by Mark A. Granquist (2015)
 Schleiermacher: Christmas Dialogue, The Second Speech, and Other Selections, edited and translated by Julia A. Lamm (2015)
 Seventeenth-Century Lutheran Meditations and Hymns, edited by Eric Lund (2011)
 The Shakers: Two Centuries of Spiritual Reflection, edited by Robley E. Whitson (1983)
 Sor Juana Inés de la Cruz: Selected Writings, translated by Pamela Kirk Rappaport (2005)
 Søren Kierkegaard: Discourses and Writings on Spirituality, translated by Christopher B. Barnett (2019)
 The Spirituality of the German Awakening, edited by David Crowner and Gerald Christianson (2003)
 Teresa of Avila: The Interior Castle, edited by Kieran Kavanaugh (1979)
 Theatine Spirituality: Selected Writings, edited by William V. Hudon (1996)
 The Theologia Germanica of Martin Luther by Bengt Hoffman (1980)
 Valentin Weigel: Selected Spiritual Writings, translated by Charles Andrew Weeks (2003)
 Vincent de Paul and Louise de Marillac: Rules, Conferences, and Writings, edited by Frances Ryan and John E. Rybolt (1995)
 William Law: A Serious Call to a Devout and Holy Life, the Spirit of Love, edited by Paul Stanwood (1978)
 Wycliffite Spirituality, edited by J. Patrick Hornbeck II, Stephen E. Lahey, and Fiona Somerset (2013)

Judaism
 Abraham Isaac Kook: The Lights of Penitence, the Moral Principles, Lights of Holiness, Essays, Letters, and Poems, translated by Ben-Zion Bokser (1978)
 Abraham Miguel Cardozo: Selected Writings, translated by David J. Halperin (2001)
 The Classic Midrash: Tannaitic Commentaries on the Bible by Reuven Hammer (1995)
 The Early Kabbalah, edited by Joseph Dan (1986)
 Elijah Benamozegh: Israel and Humanity, edited by Maxwell Luria (1995)
 Hasidic Spirituality of a New Era: The Religious Writings of Hillel Zeitlin, edited by Arthur Green (2012)
 Isaiah Horowitz: The Generations of Adam, edited by Miles Krassen (1996)
 Jewish Mystical Autobiographies: The Book of Visions and the Book of Secrets, translated by Morris M. Faierstein (1999)
 Menahem Nahum of Chemobyl: Upright Practices, the Light of the Eyes, translated by Arthur Green (1982)
 Nahman of Bratslav: The Tales, translated by Arnold Band (1978)
 Philo of Alexandria: The Contemplative Life, The Giants, and Selections by Philo of Alexandria, translated by David Winston (1981)
 Rabbinic Stories, translated by Jeffery L. Rubenstein (2002)
 Safed Spirituality: Rules of Mystical Piety, The Beginning of Wisdom, translated by Lawrence Fine (1984)
 The Talmud: Selected Writings, translated by Ben-Zion Bokser (1989)
 Zohar: The Book of Enlightenment, translated by Daniel Chanan Matt (1983)

Islam
 Abu al-Hasan al-Shushtari: Songs of Love and Devotion, translated by Lourdes Maria Alvarez (2009)
 Early Islamic Mysticism: Sufi, Qur’an, Mi’raj, Poetic and Theological Writings, edited by Michael A. Sells (1996)
 Fakhruddin Iraqi: Divine Flashes, translated by William C. Chittick and Peter L. Wilson (1982)
 Farid ad-Din Attar’s Memorial of God’s Friends: Lives and Sayings of Sufis, translated by Paul Edward Losensky (2009)
 Ibn 'Abbad of Ronda: Letters on the Sufi Path, translated by John Renard (1986)
 Ibn Al 'Arabi: The Bezels of Wisdom, translated by R. W. J. Austin (1980)
 Ibn ‘Ata’ Illah Iskandari/Kwaja Abdullah Ansari: The Book of Wisdom/Intimate Conversations, translated by Victor Danner and Wheeler M. Thackston (1978)
 Knowledge of God in Classical Sufism: Foundations of Islamic Mystical Theology, translated by John Renard (2004)
 Nizam Ad-Din Awliya: Morals for the Heart, translated by Bruce B. Lawrence (1992)
 Sharafuddin Maneri: The Hundred Letters, translated by Paul Jackson (1980)
 Umar Ibn al-Farid: Sufi Verse, Saintly Life, translated by Thomas Emil Homerin (2001)

Native American Spirituality
 Native North American Spirituality of the Eastern Woodlands: Sacred Myths, Dreams, Visions, Speeches, Healing Formulas, Rituals and Ceremonials, edited by Elizabeth Tooker (1979)
 Native Meso-American Spirituality: Ancient Myths, Discourses, Stories, Doctrines, Hymns, Poems from the Aztec, Yucatec, Quiche-Maya and Other Sacred Traditions, edited by Miguel León-Portilla (1980)

References

External links
 Paulist Press series listing

Book series introduced in 1978